East Cook is an unorganized territory in Cook County, Minnesota, United States. The population was 814 at the 2000 census.

Geography
According to the United States Census Bureau, the unorganized territory has a total area of 438.0 square miles (1,134.5 km2), of which 395.4 square miles (1,024.2 km2) is land and 42.6 square miles (110.3 km2) (9.72%) is water.

Unincorporated communities
The following unincorporated communities are located within East Cook Unorganized Territory:

 Hovland

Demographics
As of the census of 2000, there were 814 people, 372 households, and 233 families residing in the unorganized territory.  The population density was 2.1 people per square mile (0.8/km2).  There were 1,128 housing units at an average density of 2.9/sq mi (1.1/km2).  The racial makeup of the unorganized territory was 95.70% White, 1.11% Black or African American, 0.86% Native American, 0.61% Asian, 0.74% from other races, and 0.98% from two or more races. Hispanic or Latino of any race were 1.23% of the population.

There were 372 households, out of which 21.5% had children under the age of 18 living with them, 57.5% were married couples living together, 3.2% had a female householder with no husband present, and 37.1% were non-families. 29.6% of all households were made up of individuals, and 8.9% had someone living alone who was 65 years of age or older.  The average household size was 2.19 and the average family size was 2.73.

In the unorganized territory the population was spread out, with 19.2% under the age of 18, 4.7% from 18 to 24, 23.6% from 25 to 44, 37.8% from 45 to 64, and 14.7% who were 65 years of age or older.  The median age was 46 years. For every 100 females, there were 112.0 males.  For every 100 females age 18 and over, there were 109.6 males.

The median income for a household in the unorganized territory was $41,786, and the median income for a family was $49,444. Males had a median income of $31,010 versus $26,827 for females. The per capita income for the unorganized territory was $21,728.  About 11.8% of families and 13.7% of the population were below the poverty line, including 16.2% of those under age 18 and 7.4% of those age 65 or over.

References

Populated places in Cook County, Minnesota
Unorganized territories in Minnesota
Minnesota populated places on Lake Superior